Cacozelia elegans is a snout moth species in the genus Cacozelia. It is found from Venezuela to Costa Rica and Texas.

See also
 List of moths of North America (MONA 5510-6088)

References

External links

Epipaschiinae
Moths described in 1912